Concerts is a triple solo piano album by Keith Jarrett recorded in concert on May 28, 1981 at the Festspielhaus in Bregenz, Austria and on June 2, 1981 at the Herkulessaal in Munich, West Germany. It was originally released in September 1982 by ECM Records as a 3-LP set (ECM 1227-29)  and also as a single LP including only the Bregenz performance (ECM 1228). It was not until 2013 that, for the first time, ECM released a full 3-CD reissue containing both concerts.

Reception 
The Allmusic review by Richard S. Ginell awarded the album 3 stars and states, "This set is not to be confused with the earlier, more consistently inspired Solo Concerts triple album which made Jarrett a star, yet the pianist was far from tapped out in these performances. Jarrett is often in his best lyrically funky form... this is far more interesting and elevated music-making than that of the New Age navel-gazing imitators cropping up in Jarrett's wake in the early '80s".

Track listing 
All compositions by Keith Jarrett
 "Part I" - 21:54
 "Part II" - 12:04
 "Untitled" - 9:30
 "Heartland" - 6:03
 "Part I" - 23:22
 "Part II - 23:32
 "Part III" - 26:29
 "Part IV" - 11:38
 "Mon Coeur Est Rouge" - 7:11
 "Heartland" - 6:11
Recorded in concert in Bregenz, Austria on May 28, 1981 (tracks 1-4) and Munich, West Germany on June 2, 1981 (tracks 5-10).

Personnel 
 Keith Jarrett – piano

Production
 Manfred Eicher - producer
 Martin Wieland - recording engineer
 Sascha Kleis - cover design and layout

References 

Keith Jarrett live albums
1981 live albums
ECM Records live albums
Albums produced by Manfred Eicher
Instrumental albums
Solo piano jazz albums